The 2018–19 NCAA Division II men's ice hockey season began on October 26, 2018 and concluded on March 2 of the following year. This was the 37th season of second-tier college ice hockey.

Regular season

Standings

See also
 2018–19 NCAA Division I men's ice hockey season
 2018–19 NCAA Division III men's ice hockey season

References

External links

 
NCAA